James LaBelle is the name of:
 James D. La Belle (1925–1945), United States Marine who received a posthumous Medal of Honor for his service during World War II
 James W. LaBelle, American physicist, and professor at Dartmouth College